Barış Başdaş (born 17 January 1990) is a Turkish professional footballer who plays as a centre-back for Yeni Malatyaspor.

Club career
Başdaş began his career with local club 1. FC Köln. He played in the youth teams of the club before transferring to Alemannia Aachen in 2006. Başdaş played a season with the under-17 squad, before being promoted to the U19 team. He was transferred to Kasımpaşa in 2009.

Kasımpaşa
On 6 October 2013, Başdaş scored his first Super league goal against Elazığspor. He received a cross from the Dutch international Ryan Donk from the left side and Baris finished it with a header. Since 2009, Baris had played 109 games with Kasımpaşa.

Göztepe
On 25 June 2015, Başdaş had signed with Göztepe for two years on a free transfer.

Personal life
Başdaş was seriously injured in the 2023 Turkey–Syria earthquake.

References

External links
 
 

1990 births
Living people
German footballers
German people of Turkish descent
Citizens of Turkey through descent
Turkish footballers
Footballers from Cologne
Association football central defenders
Turkey B international footballers
Turkey under-21 international footballers
Turkey youth international footballers
Süper Lig players
TFF First League players
2. Bundesliga players
Kasımpaşa S.K. footballers
Göztepe S.K. footballers
Adana Demirspor footballers
Kardemir Karabükspor footballers
Alanyaspor footballers
Gençlerbirliği S.K. footballers
Fatih Karagümrük S.K. footballers
Hannover 96 players
Samsunspor footballers
Yeni Malatyaspor footballers